Phil Robinson (born Phillip Edward Robinson, 3 August 1963, Keighley, Yorkshire, England) is an English  former first-class cricketer, who played for Yorkshire County Cricket Club and Leicestershire.

Robinson made his first-class debut for his native county in 1984, and played 132 first-class games for the Tykes until 1991, averaging 35.84, passing 1,000 runs in a season on three occasions. He then moved to Leicestershire and played up to 1995, but was somewhat less successful, playing 27 matches without a century, for an average of 23.72. His best first-class score of 189, came in a Roses Match in 1991, in his penultimate match for Yorkshire.

After leaving the first-class scene, he managed Leicestershire's Second XI for four years before moving to New Zealand. Following the Christchurch earthquakes his family relocated to Queensland where he currently works as a Coach and Talent specialist for Queensland Cricket (Based in their Townsville office).

References

External links
Cricinfo Profile

1963 births
Living people
English cricketers
Yorkshire cricketers
Leicestershire cricketers
Cricketers from Keighley
Cumberland cricketers
English cricketers of 1969 to 2000